Roseville Tunnel is a  two-track railroad tunnel on the Lackawanna Cut-Off in Byram Township, Sussex County, New Jersey. Operated for freight and passenger service from 1911 to 1979, it is undergoing work intended to return it to passenger service by 2026.

History 
The tunnel was built between 1908 and 1911 by the Delaware, Lackawanna and Western Railroad (DL&W) as part of the Lackawanna Cut-Off, an immense, spare-no-expense project intended to create the straightest, flattest route practicable for its main line through the mountains of northwestern New Jersey. The contractor was David W. Flickwir of Roanoke, Virginia. Originally, the DL&W had planned to have a cut, not a tunnel, at this location. But in October 1909, anticlinal rock was encountered, described as "bastard granite", which contractors said was "so brittle and soft that you could scoop it up by the handful. It was white in color and looked much like Roquefort cheese." The fear was that this decayed rock could not be relied upon to provide sufficiently rigid support for a cut. As a result, Assistant Chief Engineer Wheaton recommended to President Truesdale that a tunnel be drilled instead, and Truesdale concurred, with work to bore a tunnel starting in December 1909. Ultimately, some 35,000 cubic yards of material were removed to create the bore.

Roseville Tunnel opened on December 24, 1911, and permitted a 70 mph (113 km/h) speed limit. In 1958, the DL&W single-tracked the line in anticipation of a merger with the Erie Railroad. Its successor, the Erie Lackawanna Railway (EL), shifted the remaining track in the tunnel several feet north to boost clearance for high-and-wide railroad cars. Conrail assumed operations of the EL in 1976, but ended service on the Cut-Off in January 1979. The railroad pulled up the tracks in mid-1984, having beaten off a protracted effort to prevent the rail from being removed, and later sold the right-of-way to two land developers.

The State of New Jersey acquired the right-of-way in 2001; ten years later, NJ Transit began to rebuild the line as part of the Lackawanna Cut-Off Restoration Project.

Rockslides

New Jersey geology makes rockslides, which can derail trains, a constant threat in deep cuts.  After the Cut-Off was closed for a month by a 1941 slide in Armstrong Cut just west of Johnsonburg, DL&W brought in heavy equipment to lessen the slope on the cut's northern side, making it nearly impossible for another rockslide to occur there.

But Roseville proved to be a different matter. Unless the Lackawanna was willing to close the line for a prolonged period, there was no way to safely scale back the tall, steep rockwalls through Colby Cut, the tunnel's western approach. Instead, after the Armstrong Cut Slide, the DL&W paid a shantyman to watch for fallen rocks at Roseville. A hand-thrown switch had already been installed in 1913 to allow trains to shift tracks if one were blocked by fallen rocks, indicating that the railroad was acutely aware of the potential threat from almost the very beginning. In later years (probably around 1950), electronic detectors were installed that could automatically set trackside signals to red if rocks broke through the detector fencing. In the 1970s, a concrete lining was applied to the westernmost 133 feet (41 m) of the tunnel to prevent rockfalls inside.  This work did not prevent chunks of rock from dislodging later on, after the abandonment of the Cut-Off.

Rehabilitation for Andover service

In 2011, New Jersey Transit received approval to re-lay 7.3 miles (11.8 km) of track from Port Morris Junction through the tunnel in order to open commuter rail service westward to Andover, New Jersey.

Eleven years passed before the next step was taken. On April 13, 2022, NJ Transit Board of Directors approved the award of an approximately $32.5 million contract to Schiavone Construction Co. of Secaucus, N.J. The work includes building 8,000 feet of track bed, doing structural work within the tunnel, removing at least 15 feet of the tunnel, improving drainage, creating an interior pedestrian path, and installing a radio system and security cameras. It also includes replacing two culverts: the one at Hudson Farm culvert, about 500 feet upstream from the Andover Station site; and Junction Brook culvert at the future station. The work is to be completed within 750 days (two years + 20 days) starting in late 2022. 

The re-opening of the line to Andover is projected to occur by 2026.

Notes

References

The Lackawanna Railroad in Northwestern New Jersey by Larry Lowenthal and William T. Greenberg, Jr., Tri-State Railway Historical Society, Inc., 1987.
Farewell to the Lackawanna Cut-Off (Parts I-IV), by Don Dorflinger, published in the Block Line, Tri-State Railway Historical Society, Inc., 1984–1985.

External links
2006 photos of Roseville Tunnel

Railroad tunnels in New Jersey
NJ Transit Rail Operations
Delaware, Lackawanna and Western Railroad tunnels
Conrail
Erie Lackawanna Railway
Tunnels completed in 1911
Lackawanna Cut-Off
Underground commuter rail